The false keel was a timber, forming part of the hull of a wooden sailing ship. The false keel was intended to protect the main keel from damage, and also protect the heads of the bolts holding the main keel together. The false keel could easily be replaced when it became damaged.

See also
Worm shoe

References

Sailing ship components
Shipbuilding